The market town of Beverley in the East Riding of Yorkshire, England, has had a fair since medieval times. In the early days the fairs were places for trading goods and animals, and were useful for meeting people and finding news of what was happening elsewhere in the country. Towns were given the right to hold fairs by Royal charter. In the early 12th century Archbishop Thurstan was granted a charter to hold fairs four times a year, each lasting up to five days. Beverley's medieval fairs were:

Feast of St John of Beverley                   (7 May)
Ascension Day                           (Early summer)
Feast of St John the Baptist            (21–5 June)
Translation of St John of Beverley      (25 October)

The four annual fairs survived until the 20th century, although the dates changed over the years.

All these fairs were for the sale of cattle and horses and were held on North Bar Within or Without. One of the two market places, Saturday Market or Wednesday Market, was used at the same time for selling general goods. Another trading area was at Highgate where goods not generally sold on the weekly markets were available, attracting ‘foreigners’ or people from other areas such as York.
The great horse fair was on Ascension Day-eve (the Cross Fair). A toll was charged for a horse entering the town and another if it was sold.

Modern times 
By the 20th century, the sale of livestock at fairs had dwindled. In 1928, sheep and cattle were only sold on the Ringing Day fair. The pleasure part of the fair, however, had gained great popularity. These funfairs were held on Saturday Market.  As the fairground equipment became larger and heavier and the use of the motor vehicle became more widespread, Saturday Market place was no longer suitable for the purpose.

On 8 September 1958, Minute 581 of the Beverley Town Council states: “It was noted that the agreement between BTC and John Farrar and Joseph Shaw to hold four fairs a year on the Market Place expired after Midsummer Fair 1959”.

On 27 October (Minute 694), “It was resolved that the fair should be removed from the Market Place.”
On 7 September 1959, the Town Clerk reported that Mr John Farrar and Joseph Shaw had accepted terms offered for use of space for the four fairs commencing with the October fair.

The fair was held four times a year on Morton Lane car park, which also housed the Town’s coach park. In 2002, the East Riding of Yorkshire Council, against the wishes of a large number of the residents sold the Morton Lane car park to Tesco, leaving the Town with nowhere to hold the fair.

The council offered space on the Westwood to hold the fair but the organisers together with the solicitors of The Showmen’s Guild demanded that they were allocated a site ‘within the walls of Beverley’ stating that The Royal Charter gave them that right.

In 2003, the Beverley Town Fair was, once again sited in the centre of the town on Saturday Market.

The fair is now limited to one week a year starting on August Bank Holiday Sunday.

See also

Beverley
 Charter fair
Fairs in England
Events in Yorkshire
Equestrian festivals